Empress of Mijak (known as Empress in North America and the United Kingdom) is the first novel in the Godspeaker series by Karen Miller. It was published in 2007.

Plot summary
Hekat, the protagonist, is a girl born unwanted and as a burden to her family. Her father beats his wife and rapes Hekat on the insistence that she should birth him more sons to plough the fields in the dry desert wasteland known as the Anvil.  

Hekat is sold to the slave traders Abajai and Yagji. Once sold, she begins her journey to the south, through the wealthier, greener Mijak, to reach the traders' home city of Et-Raklion. Along the way, Abajai teaches her how to speak courteous Mijaki, how to dress, and how to sing and dance, and keeps her away from the rest of the slaves. Hekat realizes too late that Abajai still sees her as just a slave who would fetch a good price from the warlord Raklion.

Heartbroken, Hekat runs and joins Et-Raklion Warlord's army with the help of a nameless god.

References 

2007 Australian novels
2007 fantasy novels
Australian fantasy novels
HarperCollins books
Novels by Karen Miller